The 2023 Africa U-23 Cup of Nations qualification was a men's under-23 football competition, which decided the participating teams of the 2023 Africa U-23 Cup of Nations.

Players born 1 January 2001 or later were eligible to participate in the competition. A total of eight teams qualified to play in the final tournament, including Morocco who qualified automatically as hosts.
These matches also served as the first stage of the CAF qualifiers for the 2024 Summer Olympics men's football tournament in France.

Teams
Apart from Morocco, the remaining 53 members of CAF were eligible to enter the qualifying competition, and a total of 38 national teams were in the qualifying draw, which was announced on 18 August 2022. The 18 teams which had the best performance in the 2019 Africa U-23 Cup of Nations final tournament and qualifying competition were given a bye to the second round.

Did not enter

Format
Qualification ties were played on a home-and-away, two-legged basis. If the aggregate score was tied after the second leg, away goals rule was applied, and if still tied, penalty shoot-out (no extra time) was used to determine the winner.

Schedule
The schedule of the qualifying rounds was as follows. All matches were played during the FIFA International Window.

First round

|}

Niger won 4–2 on aggregate.

3–3 on aggregate. Tanzania won on away goals.

Eswatini won 3–2 on aggregate.

Togo won 2–1 on aggregate.

DR Congo won 1–0 on aggregate. Ethiopia later advanced to the second round since DR Congo fielded an ineligible player in their first and second round matches.

Mozambique won 5–1 on aggregate.

2–2 on aggregate. Burkina Faso won on away goals.

4–4 on aggregate. Rwanda won on away goals.

Madagascar won 12–1 on aggregate.

Angola won 8–1 on aggregate.

Second round

|}

1–1 on aggregate. Niger won on away goals.

3–3 on aggregate. Sudan won on away goals.

Nigeria won 3–1 on aggregate.

Egypt won 1–0 on aggregate.

Zambia won 2–1 on aggregate.

2–2 on aggregate. South Africa won on away goals.

2–2 on aggregate. Congo won on away goals.

DR Congo won 5–4 on aggregate but was disqualified and replaced by Ethiopia to play against Algeria.

Ghana won 4–1 on aggregate.

0–0 on aggregate. Senegal won 5–3 on penalties.

Mali won 2–1 on aggregate.

Gabon won 5–0 on aggregate.

Cameroon won 3–2 on aggregate.

Third round
Winners qualified for 2023 Africa U-23 Cup of Nations.

|}

Qualified teams
The following eight teams qualified for the final tournament.

1 Bold indicates champions for that year. Italic indicates hosts for that year.

Goalscorers

Notes

References

External links
Qualifiers Of Total U-23 Africa Cup Of Nations, CAFOnline.com

Qualification
U-23 Cup of Nations qualification
U-23 Cup of Nations qualification
2022 in youth association football
2023 in youth association football